= Macrazelota cervina =

Common pig-head

Scientific classification
- Kingdom: Animalia
- Phylum: Arthropoda
- Clade: Pancrustacea
- Class: Insecta
- Order: Orthoptera
- Suborder: Caelifera
- Family: Acrididae
- Genus: Macrazelota
- Species: M. cervina

Binomial name
- Macrazelota cervina Walker, 1870

Synonyms
- Platacanthus cervina; Gerenia dilatata; Crassofemuria rubripes; Azelota cervina

Species of grasshopper

The Macrazelota cervina is a grasshopper also known as the common pig-head. It can be found in some parts of Australia.
